Halesworth railway station is on the East Suffolk Line in the east of England, serving the town of Halesworth, Suffolk. It is also the nearest station to the seaside town of Southwold. Its three-letter station code is HAS.

It is managed by Greater Anglia, which also operates all trains that call.

History

The first station at Halesworth was opened in 1854 but closed four years later and a new station opened in 1859 on an adjacent site. The station was formerly situated on a level crossing. However, it was unusual in that the platforms swung across the road rather than having typical crossing gates. The crossing is now permanently closed.

The cabin from the mechanical signal box at Halesworth has been preserved at the Mangapps Railway Museum.

On the afternoon of 18 December 1941 a German Dornier bombed the station-house, killing the stationmaster, his wife and their young maid. The station-house was rebuilt but with a reduced size.

The Halesworth and District Museum and the offices of Halesworth Area Community Transport now occupy the station building.

The station has been "adopted" by volunteers from the East Suffolk Lines Community Rail Partnership who maintain the planting and remove litter. (The station is unstaffed by Greater Anglia.)

Services
 the typical Monday-Saturday off-peak service at Halesworth is as follows:

On Sundays frequency reduces to one train every two hours in each direction. Trains direct to and from London Liverpool Street were withdrawn in 2010.

Southwold Railway

The terminus was located alongside the main railway station, allowing cross-platform interchange of passengers and having transfer sheds for the exchange of goods between the narrow gauge wagons of the Southwold Railway and the standard gauge wagons used on the main line.

In 1933 a siding was laid to serve the dairy (the big building in the picture) and milk tanks ran from Halesworth to Ilford (London) on a daily basis. The dairy closed on 30 April 1968 although rail traffic may have ceased before that date.

References

External links 

Railway stations in Suffolk
DfT Category F1 stations
Former Great Eastern Railway stations
Greater Anglia franchise railway stations
Former Southwold Railway stations
Railway stations in Great Britain opened in 1854
Railway stations in Great Britain closed in 1858
Railway stations in Great Britain opened in 1859
Halesworth